The Blizzard is a 1964 Soviet film directed by Vladimir Basov, based on the 1831 story "The Blizzard" from The Belkin Tales by Alexander Pushkin.

Plot 
Marya Gavrilovna R... was brought up on French novels. She was in love with Vladimir, a poor praporshchik. However, Maria's parents disapproved of her daughter's choice. But this does not stop Maria Gavrilovna, and she and Vladimir decide to run away, secretly get married and wait for their parents to bless them. Marya Gavrilovna wrote a letter to her parents and left. But, having arrived to get married, she feels unwell. And Vladimir, having left on a horse-drawn sleigh, loses his way due to a strong snowstorm and arrives very late, already in the morning. By that time, the church was empty: Marya Gavrilovna was mistakenly married to some other officer who happened to be in this church by chance; during the ceremony, she notices the substitution and faints, and the newly-made "husband" hastily retreats. Returning home, Masha burns the letter, after which she falls ill and is "at the edge of the coffin" for two weeks. Vladimir no longer makes attempts to meet Masha, believing that he is unworthy of her, and soon goes to the war of 1812, where he heroically dies. About three years after the beginning of the story, a 26-year-old colonel Burmin appears in the entourage of Marya Gavrilovna (her father will already die by that time, making her daughter the heir to the estate), Marya Gavrilovna falls in love with him and in the scene of the explanation learns that he is the same officer with whom she once married, and that he also has tender feelings for her.

Cast
 Valentina Titova – Maria Gavrilovna
 Oleg Vidov – Vladimir
 Georgy Martyniuk – Burmin
 Mariya Pastukhova – Praskovya Petrovna
 Sergei Papov – Gavrila Gavrilovich
 Nina Vilvovskaya – Maid
 Anatoli Ignatyev – Dranov
 Nikolai Prokopovich – Schmitt
 Nikolai Burlyayev – Lancer
 Sergey Plotnikov – Priest

External links

1964 films
Soviet romantic drama films
Mosfilm films
Films based on works by Aleksandr Pushkin
Films directed by Vladimir Basov
Films scored by Georgy Sviridov
1960s Russian-language films